Bartolomeo Carlo Borsetti (1689 – c. 1759) was an Italian painter of the late Baroque period, active in the Piedmont.

He was born in Varallo, and was the pupil of the Flemish painter Giovanni Antonio de Grott, who lived and worked at Varallo. and painted for the arch (Porta Aurea) of the 19th chapel at the Sacro Monte of Varallo. He frescoed the ceiling in the church of Santa Maria Assunta, Meina.

References

1689 births
1759 deaths
18th-century Italian painters
Italian male painters
Painters from Piedmont
Italian Baroque painters
People from Varallo Sesia
18th-century Italian male artists